James Edward Dodd (12 December 1933 – December 2017) was an English footballer, who played as a forward in the Football League for Tranmere Rovers.

References

External links

Tranmere Rovers F.C. players
Bangor City F.C. players
Association football forwards
English Football League players
1933 births
2017 deaths
English footballers